Typhoon Louise, known in Japan as the , was a deadly and destructive tropical cyclone that hit Japan, with the area hardest hit being Hyogo Prefecture. It caused at least 377 deaths and another 74 missing persons, while leaving a wide swath of damage across the country. It took place just after the cessation of World War II, causing severe damage to bases and forces that had just finished fighting in the conflict.

Being the twenty-third named storm and twelfth typhoon of the 1945 Pacific typhoon season, Louise was first seen developing on October 2 near the Caroline Islands. Moving to the northwest, it slowly organized until it strengthened to a tropical storm on the next day. It then passed between the Northern Mariana Islands on the night of October 4, bringing gale-force winds to the archipelago. However, it remained at that intensity until it started to approach the Ryukyu Islands on October 9, where it strengthened to a minimal typhoon.  While at its peak intensity of 120 km/h (75 mph), it devastated the islands, especially Okinawa. It weakened back to a tropical storm on the next day as it curved to the northeast. Louise then passed through the Chūgoku region in Japan, then moved out into the Sea of Japan while further weakening below gale-force winds, before dissipating on October 12 near the Tsugaru Strait.

Data compiled by the Japan Meteorological Agency showed that Louise killed 377 individuals over the Nansei Islands and Japan, with the majority coming from the former. However, some reports at that time estimate that the typhoon possibly killed over 500 persons, also with many of them coming from the country's islands. Some warships in the East China Sea and the Pacific Ocean were destroyed and/or sank due to high waves, increasing the number of missing individuals and deaths. Some planes and essential supplies were also destroyed. Despite the new supplies coming into the area to replace the lost goods, the damages and losses were still high. Overall, the typhoon caused hundreds of millions of damage to ships, croplands, and public establishments.

Meteorological history 

At 00:00 UTC of October 2, the Fleet Weather Center noted that a tropical depression was developing near the Caroline Islands, as a result of an equatorial outflow. Steered by high pressure to its north, it slowly moved to the northwest while slowly organizing. It remained a tropical depression at that time until 18:00 UTC of the next day, when it strengthened to a tropical storm, with the Fleet Center naming it Louise. Slow intensification occurred, and in the night of October 4, it passed between the islands of Rota and Tinian in the Northern Mariana Islands as a minimal tropical storm. Moving to the northwest, the system slowed down and fluctuated in strength; however, its circulation remained defined in weather maps. On October 7, Louise started to accelerate, with the Fleet Center forecasting that the storm may continue its northwestward trend and make landfall in Formosa; however, a high-pressure near the Philippines turned the system to the north, threatening Okinawa. Early the next day, the system strengthened to a minimal typhoon as it started to enter the East China Sea and impact the Nansei Islands. At that time until the next day, it started to batter the area while at peak intensity of 120 km/h (75 mph). It held its intensity for 21 hours until it weakened back to a tropical storm later that night as it started to curve towards the west, approaching the Japanese archipelago. A combination of unfavorable conditions and a plume of cold air further weakened Louise before making landfall somewhere near Akune in Kagoshima Prefecture on October 10. It continued moving to the northeast, passing through the Chūgoku region before accelerating to the Sea of Japan, just before extratropical transition.

On the IBTrACS records by the National Climatic Data Center, Louise moved to the east-northeast after striking the Chūgoku region, passing through the town of Ainan in Ehime Prefecture before moving through the Wakayama Bay, prior to making landfall in its prefecture. It then shifted to the north-northeast, entering the country's main sea, before dissipating on October 12. However, the data from the Japan Meteorological Agency showed that the system, after its landfall in the region, moved through the Sea of Japan before passing near Noto Peninsula, ahead of becoming extratropical on October 12. It then dissipated on the next day, just before entering the Tsugaru Strait.

Impact 
Louise had a very devastating effect on Japan. Overall, the typhoon killed at least 377 individuals (some reports estimated that 500+ deaths were recorded). The storm injured 202 people and 74 persons were recorded as missing. Over 6,181 establishments and houses were destroyed, while 174,146 more were flooded and sustained inundation damage.

It had been raining since the first part of October in Japan, due to a frontal system that arrived before Louise. This exacerbated the damages from the Makurazaki Typhoon, or Typhoon Ida, not a month later. Another reason for the severe damage is the devastation of the land, due to World War II. During the war, excessive clearing of forests resulted in mountain collapse and river flooding. Tidal forests had been lost in some coastal areas due to the collection of pine oil. The budget for hydraulic engineering projects was cut, and progress on river improvement slowed. Louise also had a very serious impact on crops and farmlands. The damage was, by prefectures, as follows:

Okinawa Prefecture 

[[File:ARB-6 Nestor.jpg|thumb|USS Nestor (ARB-6)]] washed ashore in Buckner Bay, Okinawa. After the typhoon, the ship was found wrecked.

The prefecture was occupied by the United States military at the time. This typhoon (dubbed Typhoon "Louise") was also detected by the US military, and it was supposed to head toward Taiwan, but the typhoon abruptly changed direction and headed for Okinawa. The minimum pressure was 968.5 hectopascals when the US troops arrived at 16:00 on the 9th. With a wind speed of 80 knots and 30 knots in the narrow harbor, US warships and boats moored in Nakagusuku Bay (the US military named Buckner Bay) were unable to escape to the open sea due to a sudden change in direction. Waves were up to 35 feet high. 12 ships were sunk, 222 were stranded, and 32 were wrecked as a result of these waves.

The wrecked ships during Louise are listed as follows. All locations are at Okinawa unless stated otherwise.

At the Navy Air Base, 80% of military buildings (such as prefabricated buildings known as Quonset huts) collapsed, and 60 aircraft were destroyed. The US military suffered 36 deaths, 47 missing persons, and 100 serious injuries. There were witnesses of the typhoon, also as follows:

Seaman First Class John L. Vandebrul:

Seaman First Class Gerald C. Barwinek:

Ralph Harrison, a crewman in six who survived the disaster:

Seaman First Class Barney Ball:

Louise Brugger, a Red Cross Aid which was one of the crewmen to survive as their ship passed through the eye of the typhoon:

References

External links